Heshy Fried (born December 28, 1981) is a former American stand-up comedian and blogger.

Biography

Fried was raised on the Upper West Side of Manhattan and he attended the Talmudical Institute of Upstate New York (TIUNY) but did not graduate.

While in college, Fried became an avid outdoorsman and cyclist. He raced mountain bikes, skied frequently, and went on extended backpacking trips throughout the United States northeast, as well as Montana, Alaska, and Utah. In June 2006, while working as an intern during the budget season for the New York State Assembly, he began writing down his thoughts about the Orthodox Jewish community and posting them on Craigslist New York's "Rant and Raves" section. Around this time he attended a wedding in Toronto, Canada and was introduced to blogging by his friend Sarah Zeldman, a life coach and professional blogger.

Fried moved to the San Francisco Bay area in early 2010 and was employed as a line cook at The Kitchen Table, then Silicon Valley's only kosher eatery. He is owner/chef at the Epic Bites catering company in Oakland

Fried became engaged in January 2012. He married his wife on June 17, 2012, at the Jewish Community Center in Los Gatos, California. They currently live in the Bay Area.

Frum Satire
Fried began blogging on Frum Satire in June 2006 when he lived in Albany, New York, but did not enter the spotlight until about six months later when he wrote a post outlining different categories of sects in the Orthodox and Protestants community. Several more notable bloggers linked to the post, and Fried's work began to attract more attention. In November 2008, Fried performed stand-up satirizing the Orthodox community on stage for the first time when Israeli comedian David Kilimnick asked Fried to open for him in New York. Rave reviews pushed him to start posting stand-up comedy videos of himself and others on YouTube, where he gained a large following of thousands of viewers.

Blog posts received as many as 250 comments, and the website provided a forum for all types of readers, Jews, and gentiles alike, to discuss varying issues in an open, uncensored forum. 

Fried was named one of the most influential Jewish bloggers in 2008 and was one of seven bloggers invited to Israel to attend the first International Jewish Bloggers Conference hosted by Nefesh B'Nefesh on August 20, 2008. Fried was also invited to attend the Fourth Annual ROI Summit from June 28 through July 2, 2009, held in Tel Aviv, Israel, for influential young Jewish innovators from around the world.

In 2009, Frum Satire averaged approximately 50,000 visitors a month. However, Fried stopped updating his blog in 2014.

References

External links
Jewish Press
NJ Jewish News
Frum Satire
Epic Bites Catering

American stand-up comedians
Jewish American male comedians
1981 births
Living people
Jewish bloggers
American Orthodox Jews
21st-century American comedians
Orthodox and Hasidic Jewish comedians
21st-century American Jews